William Neal Deramus Jr. (March 25, 1888 – December 2, 1965) was an American railroad executive. He served as the longest running president, which was 20 years, for the Kansas City Southern Railway (KCS) from 1941 to 1961. Deramus led the Kansas City Southern Railway through the Great Depression by encouraging industry to locate on the Gulf Coast in Louisiana and Texas. He helped the railway avoid bankruptcy in the 1930s and refinanced $67 million in bonded debt that fell due in the late 1940s.

Deramus's formal education ended after 8th grade. Before he was 14, he agreed to tend the switch lamps eagerly and keep the station in order for $4 a month — plus an opportunity to become proficient in weaving those mysterious clicks into words so powerfully that they moved the trains for the Louisville and Nashville Railroad (L&N).

Within a year, Deramus began pounding a key as a relief operator. He learned his profession, and the detail of railroading, fast and moved on to better positions. From the L&N, he went to the Atlantic Coast Line Railroad (ACL), then to the Southern Railway (SOU), where, at 20, he became a dispatcher in Memphis, Tennessee.

His chief in Memphis resigned to accept a job with the Kansas City Southern Railway in Pittsburg, Kansas. Pleased with the prospects there, the chief wrote to his protégé about the opportunities with the new road — and opportunities were all Deramus needed.

On November 9, 1909, the name of W. N. Deramus first appeared on a KCS payroll. From telegraph operator he advanced to dispatcher, then chief dispatcher. Next, he was superintendent of car service, then superintendent of the Southern Division. He was elected as the general manager, then the vice-president and general manager, the executive vice-president, and then to the president of the railway in 1941. In 1945 he was elected as the president and chairman of the board.

He spent almost half his time out on the railway. It is said that he knew the 1,647 miles of track between Kansas City and the Gulf of Mexico so well that he could tell where he was by the sound of the wheels on the rails. Under the impetus he provided the Kansas City Southern, its net income was twice the industry average.

Deramus was a major figure in Kansas City's civic life. In 1957, the Deramus' family donated the Deramus Field Station to MRIGlobal to support the organization's growing contract research business.

References

1888 births
1965 deaths
20th-century American railroad executives
Dispatchers
Kansas City Southern Railway